Denaby United Football Club is a football club based in Denaby, Doncaster, South Yorkshire, England.

History
The club was formed as Denaby Parish Church, and it was not long after the club was formed in 1895 that they gained a reputation as one of the biggest success stories in local football circles. Within five years of formation Denaby had already won the South Yorkshire League three times (having changed their name to Denaby United in 1898), in their debut FA Cup campaign in 1899 they reached the 3rd Qualifying Round, only losing to Hunslet after a second replay at Oakwell.

In 1902 Denaby left the Sheffield Association League, a competition they had been members of for just two years, to join the Midland League, at the time one of the most prestigious competitions outside the Football League. In 1906 they won the Sheffield and Hallamshire Senior Cup for the first time, but two years later the young Owls gained their revenge by pipping Denaby to the Midland League title. They won the Senior Cup for a second time in 1910 but resigned from the Midland League in 1913 to rejoin the Association League after falling on hard times and finishing bottom of the league for two years running. This came just a year after they had moved to their new home at Tickhill Square from their old one, the Recreation Ground, on Denaby Lane.

After the First World War, Denaby successfully applied to re-join the Midland League. In 1927 the club reached the First Round of the FA Cup for the first time, setting a new ground attendance record of 5,200 for the game against Southport. They repeated the feat in 1932 when they lost 0–1 to Carlisle United at Brunton Park. Later that season they secured the Sheffield Senior Cup for a third time (they lost their first Senior Cup final in 1935 but won the cup again a year later by beating Worksop Town on their own ground).

Unlike their hiatus for the duration of the World War I, Denaby continued to play throughout World War II, competing again in the Sheffield Association League as the Midland League had been put on hold. They reached the league play-offs in 1944 but were beaten by Sheffield Wednesday reserves at Hillsborough.

When the war ended the club was re-admitted to the Midland League. Denaby reached the First Round of the FA Cup again in 1958, losing 2–3 at home to Oldham Athletic in front 'only' 3,807 spectators. The club was forced to play in the Central Alliance during the 1960–61 season when the Midland League disbanded, but re-joined when the issues surrounding the league's demise were settled. Their long stay in the Midland League would come to an end just four years later however, when they were voted out of the competition following two bottom placed finishes.

The club entered into the Yorkshire Football League for the 1965–66 season, joining Division Two. It took just two years for Denaby to achieve promotion to Division One, and in 1968 they just missed out on winning the league championship, finishing runners-up. They were relegated from the top flight in 1979, and by 1981 found themselves in the Third Division for the first time.  In 1982 the Yorkshire League merged with the Midland League to form the Northern Counties East League (NCEL) and Denaby were placed in Division One South after finishing second in their final Yorkshire League Division Three campaign.

They won promotion to the NCEL Premier Division in 1984 and would remain there for the next 17 years, winning the league title in 1997 with the likes of Mel Sterland and Imre Varadi boosting the ranks.

In 2001 the club received a bombshell when the local miners welfare trust informed them they would not be allowed to play at Tickhill Square beyond the end of the 2001–02 season. Despite the pleas of members of the public and Caroline Flint MP, the decision was upheld and come May 2002, with no home ground, the club was dissolved. The club's last game was on 4 May 2002 against Arnold Town.

In 2011 a second Denaby United was formed, playing in the Doncaster and District Senior League. This club, based at Old Road, Conisbrough, progressed through the local league ranks and for the 2015-16 season was participating in the Sheffield & Hallamshire County Senior League Division 1.

Season by season record

* League play-off winners** League playoff runners-up

Notable former players
Players that have played in the Football League either before or after playing for Denaby United –

  Steve Adams
  Wally Ardron
  Reg Attwell
  Walter Aveyard
  Jack Barker
  Jamie Barnwell-Edinboro
  Chris Beaumont
  Walter Bennett
  John Bilton
  Arnold Birch
  John Bisby
  Eddie Boot
  Harold Buddery
  George Briggs
  Keith Burkinshaw
  Ralph Burkinshaw
  Sam Cowan
  Sam Cox
  Harry Draper
  Stewart Evans
  Joby Godfrey
  Albert Green
  Jimmy Harrop
  Leslie Hofton
  Harold Hughes
  Jimmy Hutchinson
  Howard Johnson
  David Kaye
  Chris Kelly
  Sam Kennedy
  Seth King
  John Lang
  Don Lees
  James Massey
  Wally McArthur
  Walter Millership
  Matt Moralee
  Harold Mosby
  Cliff Parker
  Edgar Powell
  Mick Prendergast
  Norman Rimmington
  Arthur Rodgers
  Bobby Saxton
  Aubrey Scriven
  Lionel Smith
  Mel Sterland
  Billy Taylor
  Ray Taylor
  Dennis Thompson
  Fred Thompson
  Tommy Tompkins
  John Westwood
  Ben Wheelhouse
  Billy Windle
  Tim Womack

Grounds
Denaby's first home was a ground on Denaby Lane, but in 1912 they moved to a new home at Tickhill Square on Wadworth Street. They stayed there until dissolution in 2002.

Honours

League
Midland League
Runners-up: 1907–08
Yorkshire League Division One
Runners-up: 1967–68
Yorkshire League Division Two
Promoted: 1966–67
Northern Counties East League Premier Division
Champions: 1996–97
Northern Counties East League Division One South
Promoted: 1983–84
Sheffield Association League
Runners-up: 1901–02
South Yorkshire League
Champions: 1896–97, 1897–98, 1898–99

Cup
Sheffield & Hallamshire Senior Cup
Winners: 1905–06, 1909–10, 1932–33, 1935–36, 1986–87
Runners-up: 1934–35, 1951–52, 1959–60, 1974–75, 1982–83, 1989–90

Records
Best FA Cup performance: 1st Round, 1927–28, 1932–33, 1958–59
Best FA Trophy performance: 2nd Round, 1971–72
Best FA Vase performance: 4th Round, 1983–84
Record attendance: 5,200 vs. Southport, FA Cup, 1927–28

References

External links
Official website

Association football clubs established in 1895
Association football clubs disestablished in 2002
Sport in the Metropolitan Borough of Doncaster
Football clubs in South Yorkshire
1895 establishments in England
2002 disestablishments in England
Yorkshire Football League
Northern Counties East Football League
Football clubs in England
Sheffield Association League
Hatchard League
Central Alliance
Midland Football League (1889)
Doncaster & District Senior League
Mining association football teams in England